Henry Reginald Courtenay (8 June 1714 – 30 April 1763) of Aldershot, Hampshire, was an English politician.

He was the second surviving son of Sir William Courtenay, 2nd Baronet of Powderham Castle, Devon and the younger brother of William Courtenay, 1st Viscount Courtenay. He was educated at Westminster School and Magdalen College, Oxford.

He was a Member (MP) of the Parliament of Great Britain for Honiton in 1741–1747 and 1754–30 April 1763. 

On 14 April 1737, he married Lady Catherine Bathurst (d. 1783), daughter of Allen Bathurst, 1st Earl Bathurst. They had 2 sons and 2 daughters. One son was Reginald Courtenay (bishop of Exeter).

Ancestry

References

1714 births
1763 deaths
Politicians from Aldershot
People educated at Westminster School, London
Alumni of Magdalen College, Oxford
Members of the Parliament of Great Britain for Honiton
British MPs 1741–1747
British MPs 1754–1761
Younger sons of baronets